This is a list of notable people from Banská Bystrica, Slovakia.

 Rudolf Baláž, Bishop of the Roman Catholic Diocese of Banská Bystrica 1990 to 2011
 Matej Bel, writer, historian
 Paľo Bielik, film director, actor
 Ján Botto, poet 
 Andrej Braxatoris-Sládkovič, poet
 Peter Budaj, ice hockey player
 Ján Cikker, classical composer
 Viliam Figuš-Bystrý, classical composer
 Ján Golian, general
 Marek Hamšík, football player
 Michal Handzuš, ice hockey player
 Judith Hellwig, opera singer
 László Hudec, architect
 Adam František Kollár
 Anastasiya Kuzmina, biathlete, olympic gold medalist
 Ivan Majeský, ice hockey player
 Jozef Murgaš, inventor
 Barbara Nedeljáková, actress
 Vladimír Országh, ice hockey player
 Hana Ponická, writer, anti-communist dissident
 Haviva Reik, Jewish soldier
 Radovan Sloboda (born 1966), Slovak politician
 Tomáš Surový, ice hockey player
 Peter Tomka, diplomat
 Ladislav Záborský, painter
 Richard Zedník, ice hockey player

References

Banská Bystrica
 
Banska Bystrica
People from Banska Bystrica